Faik Samet Gunes (born 27 May 1993) is a Turkish male volleyball player. He is part of the Turkey men's national volleyball team. On the club level he plays for Halkbank Ankara.

Sporting achievements

Clubs

National championships
 2015/2016  Turkish SuperCup 2015, with Halkbank Ankara
 2015/2016  Turkish Championship, with Halkbank Ankara

References

External links
FIVB profile

1993 births
Living people
Turkish men's volleyball players
People from Tokat
Halkbank volleyball players
21st-century Turkish people